A list of horror films released in 1991.

References

Sources

 
 

 

Lists of horror films by year
1991-related lists